Harpalus amariformis is a species of ground beetle in the subfamily Harpalinae. It was described by Victor Motschulsky in 1844.

References

amariformis
Beetles described in 1844
Taxa named by Victor Motschulsky